Parapithecoidea is an extinct superfamily of primates which lived in the Eocene and Oligocene periods in Egypt. In some classifications all Parapithecoidea are placed within the family Parapithecidae. Seiffert et al. (2010) propose that Parapithecoidea arose during the Bartonian (middle Eocene), with a split between Biretia and the Parapithecidae occurring early in the Priabonian (late Eocene).

The examination of the dentition of Arsinoea by Seiffert et al. led them to consider that Arsinoea may or may not be a parapithecid, although certainly parapithecoidal, and suggest that Arsinoea kallimos be treated as incertae sedis within Parapithecoidea.

Morphological analysis of fossil evidence presented in 2020 implies a parapithecid monkey species rafted across the Atlantic in the Paleogene and at least briefly colonized South America. Ucayalipithecus remains dating from the Early Oligocene of Amazonian Peru are deeply nested within the Parapithecidae, and have dental features markedly different from those of platyrrhines. Qatrania wingi of lower Oligocene Fayum deposits is considered the closest known relative of Ucayalipithecus. The absence of later fossil finds from this group in South America indicates they were outcompeted by platyrrhines.

Families
†Parapithecidae

References

Prehistoric primates
Mammal superfamilies
Eocene first appearances
Oligocene extinctions